The Tripoli Protection Force  is a militia that was formed from the merger of four pro-Libyan Army Libyan militias on 18 December 2018.

Groups involved in the merger include: the Tripoli Brigade, the Abusleem Deterence and Rapid Intervention Force, the Nawasi 8th Force, and the Bab Tajura brigade. All but the Bab Tajura brigade were considered the most prominent militias in Tripoli prior to the merger.

References

Military of Libya
Second Libyan Civil War